The Lithuanian Rifle Corps was a riflemen unit of the Grand Duchy of Lithuania.

History 

By 1789, sharpshooter platoons were formed in each Lithuanian infantry battalion. In 1791, the platoons were gathered into regimental companies. Finally, they were consolidated into the Rifle Corps. In 1792, the rifle corps was formed in general Byszewski's reserve division.

Composition 
The Lithuanian Rifle Corps was composed of four battalions.

Uniforms 
Officers had a green uniform with poppy red facings, one golden epaulette and black Hessian boots.

Bibliography

Citations

References 
 
 

Infantry units and formations of the Lithuanian Army
Military units and formations disestablished in 1794